Miami RedHawks basketball may refer to either of the basketball teams that represent Miami University:

Miami RedHawks men's basketball
Miami RedHawks women's basketball